Mascot railway station is located on the Airport line, serving the Sydney suburb of Mascot. It is served by Sydney Trains T8 Airport & South line services.

History
Mascot station opened on 21 May 2000 when the Airport line opened from Central to Wolli Creek. Like other stations on the line, Mascot was built and is operated by the Airport Link Company as part of a public–private partnership.

Prior to March 2011, passengers were required to pay an access fee to use the station. The access fee was removed after the State Government reached an agreement with the Airport Link Company to pay the fee at Mascot and Green Square stations on behalf of passengers. Following the removal of the fee, patronage increased by around 70% at the two stations in the months following, and passenger numbers rose substantially in the years following – with a 117% increase in ridership between 2015 and 2019.

The concourse of Mascot station contains the Mascot Operations Room, which is responsible for operation of the four privately operated stations on the Airport line.

At the platforms the station is signed "Mascot Suburban", to prevent confusion with the stations for the nearby airport, which is often referred to as Mascot Airport.

Planned upgrade 
Following the substantial increase in passenger numbers since the removal of the access fee, it was announced in June 2020 that a new entrance/exit was to be built. This would be located on the western side of Bourke Street – opposite the existing main entrance. The existing station would also be upgraded, with additional ticket gates and public toilets. Works began in early 2021 and is expected to be completed in late 2022.

Platforms & services

Transport links
Transdev John Holland operates three routes via Mascot station:
306: to Redfern station
307: to Westfield Eastgardens
350: Domestic Terminal to Bondi Junction station

Transit Systems operates two routes via Mascot station:
358: Sydenham station to Randwick
420: to Westfield Burwood

Gallery

References

External links

Mascot Station at Transport for New South Wales (Archived 10 June 2019)
Mascot Station Public Transport Map Transport for NSW

Easy Access railway stations in Sydney
Railway stations located underground in Sydney
Railway stations in Australia opened in 2000
Mascot, New South Wales
Airport Link, Sydney